The Municipality of Tržič is a municipality in the traditional region of Upper Carniola in northwestern Slovenia. The seat of the municipality is the town of Tržič. Tržič became a municipality in 1994.

Settlements
In addition to the municipal seat of Tržič, the municipality also includes the following settlements:

 Bistrica pri Tržiču
 Brdo
 Breg ob Bistrici
 Brezje pri Tržiču
 Čadovlje pri Tržiču
 Dolina
 Gozd
 Grahovše
 Hudi Graben
 Hudo
 Hušica
 Jelendol
 Kovor
 Križe
 Leše
 Loka
 Lom pod Storžičem
 Novake
 Paloviče
 Podljubelj
 Popovo
 Potarje
 Pristava
 Retnje
 Ročevnica
 Sebenje
 Senično
 Slap
 Spodnje Vetrno
 Vadiče
 Visoče
 Zgornje Vetrno
 Žiganja Vas
 Zvirče

References

External links

Municipality of Tržič on Geopedia
Municipality of Tržič website

Tržič
1994 establishments in Slovenia